The Dana–Thomas House (also known as the Susan Lawrence Dana House and Dana House) is a home in Prairie School style designed by architect Frank Lloyd Wright.  Built 1902–04 for patron Susan Lawrence Dana, it is located along East Lawrence Avenue in Springfield, Illinois.  The home reflects the mutual affection of the patron and the architect for organic architecture, the relatively flat landscape of the U.S. state of Illinois, and the Japanese aesthetic as expressed in Japanese prints.

Susan Lawrence Dana
Susan Lawrence Dana (1862–1946) was an independent-minded woman and heiress to a substantial fortune, including silver mines in the Rocky Mountains.  Widowed in 1900, Dana enjoyed complete control over her household and fortune.  Eager to express her personality and become a leading philanthropic figure in Springfield, Dana decided to completely remodel her family's Italianate mansion located in the state capital's fashionable "Aristocracy Hill" neighborhood.

Dana House
Dana's search for an architect to match her aspirations ended when she was introduced in 1902 to Frank Lloyd Wright, the rising leader of the new Prairie School movement of "organic architecture" which stressed congruence between the interior of a building and its surroundings.

The Dana commission to plan the remodeling of the Lawrences' Italianate mansion was the largest Wright had received.  Recognizing a kindred spirit in Mrs. Dana, he expanded the boundaries of his contract to design and build what was, in effect, an entirely new house showcasing his approach to the Prairie Style aesthetic.

The new home reflected the flamboyant personalities of the patron and the architect, particularly their love of Japanese prints and drawings.  The structure was designed for both display and entertainment.  An arched doorway admitted guests into a series of expanding spaces, transitioning from vestibule to the reception hall.

The concept of "expanding space" was repeated throughout the house, with windows placed to continually draw the attention of someone within toward an awareness of the outside.  Wright designed approximately 450 art glass windows, skylights, door panels, sconces, and light fixtures for the house, most of which survive.  Much of the art glass, and the mural by George Mann Niedecken surmounting the dining room interior, centered on a sumac motif.

A substantial west wing leads visitors through an interior Torii gate into two of the largest rooms in the house.  The upper-level gallery was used for musical entertaining, and the ground-level library contains special easels, part of more than 100 pieces of free-standing Wright-designed white oak furniture in the house, created for Dana to display selections from her collection of Japanese prints,.

Dana lived in the home from 1904 until about 1928.  Once a successful hostess and leader of Springfield's social scene, she became increasingly reclusive over time and turned her attention to spiritualism and the occult.  Suffering from increasing financial constraints in her later years, she closed the main house around 1928 and moved to a small cottage on the grounds.  As Dana struggled with age-related dementia in the 1940s, her home and its contents were sold.

Dana-Thomas House

Charles C. Thomas, a successful medical publisher, was the second owner and custodian of the home from 1944 to his death in 1969. A view of the building was featured on the title pages of some of his publications. His wife Nanette maintained in that role until her passing in 1975.  The couple are credited with maintaining the house's original furnishings and design, and their estate with selling the home and its furnishings as a unit to the state of Illinois in 1981 for $1.0 million, significantly less than could have been earned had the household been broken up.

The home today
The home became a state historic site under the Illinois Historic Preservation Agency (IHPA).  The IHPA led a restoration effort in 1987–1990 that restored the structure and its contents to its appearance in 1910.  It is believed to contain one of the most intact Frank Lloyd Wright designed interiors in the United States.   Restoration plans and documents are held by the Ryerson & Burnham Libraries at the Art Institute of Chicago.

The house was featured in Bob Vila's A&E Network 1996 production, Guide to Historic Homes of America. In celebration of the 2018 Illinois Bicentennial, the Dana Thomas House was selected as one of the Illinois 200 Great Places  by the American Institute of Architects Illinois component (AIA Illinois).

As part of a program of budget cuts, the state of Illinois temporarily closed the Dana–Thomas House to the public from December 1, 2008, until April 23, 2009.  The Dana–Thomas House again closed for 11 months in 2011 for renovations to interior and exterior finish as well as mechanical and security systems.

References

William Allin Storrer, The Frank Lloyd Wright Companion. University of Chicago Press, 2006, (S.072)

External links

State of Illinois site

Speaking of History Podcast about touring the Dana Thomas House in June 2007
Photos on Arcaid
Illinois Great Places - Dana Thomas House
Society of Architectural Historians ARCHIPEDIA entry on the Susan Lawrence Dana House
Computer animation of Dana-Thomas House by Razin Khan

Houses completed in 1904
Frank Lloyd Wright buildings
National Historic Landmarks in Illinois
National Register of Historic Places in Springfield, Illinois
Houses on the National Register of Historic Places in Illinois
Historic American Buildings Survey in Illinois
Houses in Springfield, Illinois
Historic house museums in Illinois
Illinois State Historic Sites
Museums in Springfield, Illinois